The Cutting Room Recording Studios is a recording studio in New York City, opened in 1995 by David Crafa. The company is currently located in Greenwich Village, Manhattan, New York City.

History
David Crafa started The Cutting Room studios while he was still a student at New York University in a loft space on West 25th Street. The first official studio location was in a leased space on the fifth floor at 678 Broadway. The studios are now located at 14 East 4th street in the historic building now known as The Silk Building.

Legacy

Ben H. Allen
Producer Ben H. Allen worked as an assistant engineer at The Cutting Room early in his music career.

Just Blaze
Producer Justin Smith, better known as Just Blaze, started as an intern at The Cutting Room and moved his way to night manager and lead producer.

Mike Elizondo
Mike Elizondo mixed Regina Spektor's album What We Saw from the Cheap Seats at Studio A in 2011.

Film, Television and Video Games 

Over the last 10 years, The Cutting Room has emerged as a leader in Audio Post Production, both in film and television as well as podcast and audiobook recording. Equipped with a Zephyr ISDN box, the studio specializes in remote connections in addition to ADR and voiceover recording.

KEXP Partnership 
The Cutting Room has partnered with KEXP radio to provide space and technology for artists to connect their live performances with listeners around the world. Over the course of the partnership The Cutting Room has hosted the radio station's NYC in-studio performances, including Yeasayer and Fitz and the Tantrums.

References

External links 
 

Recording studios in Manhattan
Companies based in Manhattan
Culture of New York City